CenturyTel of Redfield, Inc., founded in 1970, is a subsidiary of CenturyLink providing local telephone services to Redfield, Arkansas.

1970 establishments in Arkansas
Lumen Technologies
Companies based in Arkansas
American companies established in 1970
Redfield, Arkansas
Telecommunications companies of the United States
Telecommunications companies established in 1970